Petrophytum (orth. var. Petrophyton) is a small genus of plants in the rose family known as the rock spiraeas or rockmats. These are low mat-forming shrubs which send up erect stems bearing spike inflorescences of flowers. The brushy flowers are white and have many stamens and hairy, thready pistils. Rockmats are native to western North America.

Species:
Petrophytum caespitosum — mat rock spiraea
Petrophytum cinerascens — halfshrub rockmat, Chelan rockmat
Petrophytum hendersonii — Olympic Mountain rockmat

References

External links
Jepson Manual Treatment
USDA Plants Profile
The Plant List: A Working List of All Plant Species

 
Spiraeeae
Rosaceae genera